The Bengal women's cricket team is a women's cricket team that represents the Indian state of West Bengal. The team competes in the Women's Senior One Day Trophy and the Women's Senior T20 Trophy. The won the One Day Trophy in 2018–19, beating Andhra in the final by 10 runs.

Notable players
Jhulan Goswami
Deepti Sharma
Richa Ghosh

Current squad

Mita Paul
Dhara Gujjar
Rumeli Dhar (c)
Deepti Sharma
Aparna Mondal (wk)
Jhulan Goswami
Richa Ghosh
Parna Paul
Jayram Mamata
Gopal Prativa
Jhumia Khatun
Gouher Sultana
Sushmita Ganguly
Rukmini Roy
Shrayoshi Aich

Honours
 Women's Senior One Day Trophy
 Winners (1): 2018–19
 Women's Senior T20 Trophy:
 Runners-up (2): 2010–11, 2019–20

See also
 Bengal cricket team

References

Cricket in West Bengal
Women's cricket teams in India